Chiesa di San Sepolcro  is a church in Milan, Italy. It was originally built in 1030, but has undergone multiple revisions. The church is located at Piazza San Sepolcro in the historic center of Milan.

The latest interior restoration was in 1713–1719, while the present Neo-Romanesque facade was completed in 1894–1897, under the designs of 
Gaetano Moretti and Cesare Nava. The Bramantino frescoes were moved from the portal to the inside of the church. Other works inside are attributed to Francesco Maria Richini and Carlo Bellosio.

References

Sepolcro
1030 establishments in Europe
11th-century establishments in Italy
Tourist attractions in Milan
11th-century Roman Catholic church buildings in Italy